The year 1736 in science and technology involved some significant events.

Botany
 Charles Marie de La Condamine, with François Fresneau Gataudière, makes the first scientific observations of rubber, in Ecuador.

Earth sciences
 June 19 – French Academy of Sciences expedition led by Pierre Louis Maupertuis, with Anders Celsius, begins work on measuring a meridian arc in the Torne Valley of Finland.

Mathematics
 June 8 – Leonhard Euler writes to James Stirling describing the Euler–Maclaurin formula, providing a connection between integrals and calculus.
 Euler produces the first published proof of Fermat's "little theorem".
 Sir Isaac Newton's Method of Fluxions (1671), describing his method of differential calculus, is first published (posthumously) and Thomas Bayes publishes a defense of its logical foundations against the criticism of George Berkeley (anonymously).

Medicine
 Early 1736 – The “Publick Workhouse and House of Correction” that is to become Bellevue Hospital in New York City is ready for occupancy.
 c. October – Winchester County Hospital, established by Prebendary Alured Clarke, the first voluntary general hospital in the English provinces.

Awards
 Copley Medal: John Theophilus Desaguliers

Births
 January 19 – James Watt, Scottish mechanical engineer (died 1819)
 January 25 – Joseph Louis Lagrange, Piedmont-born mathematician (died 1813)
 June 14 – Charles-Augustin de Coulomb, French physicist (died 1806)
 July 12 – Louis Lépecq de La Clôture, French epidemiologist (died 1804)
 August 19 – Erland Samuel Bring, Swedish mathematician (died 1798)
 November 3 – Christiaan Brunings, Dutch hydraulic engineer (died 1805)
 John Arnold, Cornish-born watchmaker (died 1799)
 Honoré Blanc, French gunsmith (died 1801)

Deaths
 September 16 – Gabriel Fahrenheit, German-born Dutch physicist and engineer (born 1686)
 October 13 – Georges Mareschal, French surgeon (born 1658)

References

 
18th century in science
1730s in science